Frank Fairhurst (1892 – 30 August 1953) was a British Labour Party politician.

Fairhurst was the Member of Parliament (MP) for Oldham from 1945 to 1950 and for Oldham East from 1950 to 1951.

Fairhurst also served as the president of National Association of Power Loom Overlookers, and as president of the Wigan Textile Trades Federation.  He served on Wigan Town Council until his death.

References

External links 
 

1892 births
1953 deaths
Labour Party (UK) MPs for English constituencies
UK MPs 1945–1950
UK MPs 1950–1951
Politics of the Metropolitan Borough of Oldham
United Textile Factory Workers' Association-sponsored MPs